Sfântu Gheorghe (or Szentgyörgy ; ; English lit.: Saint George) is the capital city of Covasna County, Romania. Located in the central part of the country and in the historical region of Transylvania, it lies on the Olt River in a valley between the Baraolt Mountains and Bodoc Mountains. The city administers two villages, Chilieni (Kilyén) and Coșeni (Szotyor).

History
Sfântu Gheorghe is one of the oldest cities in Transylvania, the settlement first having been documented in 1332. The city takes its name from Saint George, the patron of the local church. Historically it was also known in German as Sankt Georgen. The "sepsi" prefix (sebesi → sepsi, meaning "of Sebes") refers to the area which the ancestors of the local Székely population had inhabited before settling to the area of the town. The previous area of their settlement was around the town of "Sebes" (now: Sebeș) which later became populated mainly by Transylvanian Saxons.

While part of the Kingdom of Hungary, the city was the economic and administrative center of the Hungarian county of Háromszék, which spanned the present-day Covasna County and parts of Brașov County. In the second half of the 19th century, Sepsiszentgyörgy witnessed the development of light industry, namely a textile and a cigarette factory was built. It became part of the Kingdom of Romania following the Treaty of Trianon in 1920, after the end of World War I. After the Second Vienna Award in 1940 the city came under Hungarian control for four years. Near the end of that period, the Sfântu Gheorghe ghetto briefly existed in the city. At the end of the Second World War the Paris Peace Treaties reaffirmed the city and the entirety of Transylvania as a Romanian territory. Between 1952 and 1960 it was the southernmost town of the Magyar Autonomous Region, and between 1960 and 1968 was part of the Brașov Region, abolished in 1968 when Romania was reorganised based on counties rather than regions.

Sfântu Gheorghe is one of the centres for the Székely people in the region known to them as Székelyföld in Hungarian – which means "Székely Land", and is home to the Székely National Museum. The city hosts two market fairs each year.

Demographics

The majority of the city's inhabitants are Hungarians. In the census of 2011, 41,233 (74%) of the city's 56,006 inhabitants classed themselves as ethnic Hungarians, 11,807 (21%) as Romanians, 398 (0.7%) as Roma, and 2,562 as other ethnicities or no information. 74% had Hungarian as first language, and 21% Romanian.

Sights
 Fortified Church – constructed in the 14th century in Gothic style
 Beör Palace – constructed in the 19th century in Neoclassical style
 State Archive, the former headquarters of the Hussar battalions
 County library constructed in 1832 as the seat of the county council
 Theater used from 1854 to 1866 as the city hall
 The market bazaar built in 1868, with a clock tower built in 1893
 Székely National Museum, founded 1875

Economy
The predominant industry in the city is the textile industry. The city holds underutilized production capabilities such as a downsized automobile transmission parts and gearboxes factory (IMASA SA) and a tobacco factory (TIGARETE SA).

Services sector contains growing areas such as IT services with ROMARG SRL the leading domain registrar and web hosting provider in Romania having its headquarters here.

Sports

Football
The main sport in the city is football. The city has a men's football team called ACS Sepsi OSK Sfântu Gheorghe (Sepsiszentgyörgyi OSK). 
In the 2016–2017 season the team promoted from the 2nd Division and currently play in the Romanian 1st Division.

Basketball
The city has also a women's basketball team called ACS Sepsi SIC. Sepsi-SIC has won the Romanian Championship in 2016, 2017 and 2018 season.
 In the 2007/2008 season the team has finished in the 2nd place in the regular season, and lost the final (2-3) against BC ICIM Arad, but they win the Romanian Cup.
 In the 2008/2009 season the team finished in the 3rd position after the regular season and they lost in the final (0-3) against MCM Târgoviste.
 In the 2008/2009 season LMK Sepsi BC played in the FIBA EuroCup Women. In the EuroCup Women 2008–09, the team was drawn in Group B with Dynamo Kursk (Russia), Bnot Hasharon (Israel) and Challes-les-Eaux (France). They finished in the 3rd place with 3 wins and 3 losses. In the Sixteenth-Finals they meet Cras Basket Taranto (Italy) and they lost both games.
 LMK Sepsi BC participates in EuroCup Women 2009–10 and was drawn in Group G with Dynamo Moscow, Hapoel Tel Aviv and Dunav Econt Rousse. They finished in the 3rd place with 2 wins and 4 defeats. In the Sixteenth-Finals they met Mann Filter Zaragoza and they lost both games.
 In the 2009/2010 season the team finished in the 2nd position after the regular season, but they lost in the semifinals of the play-off against BC ICIM Univ. Vasile Goldis Arad (1-2). They finished in the 3rd place beating CSM Satu Mare (2-0) and they won the bronze medals in the Romanian Championship and in the Romanian Cup too.
 In the 2010/2011 season the team finished in the 3rd position after the regular season, they lost in the semifinals of the play-off against BC ICIM Univ. Vasile Goldis Arad (1–2). They finished in the 3rd place beating BCM Danzio Timișoara (2–0) and they won the bronze medals in the Romanian Championship and in the Romanian Cup too.
In the 2015–2016 season the club wins the Romanian Cup and for the first time was the Romanian Championship beating in the Final CSU Alba Iulia (3–0).

Futsal
The city also has a futsal team which plays in the Romanian First Division. The name of the team is Futsal Club Sfântu Gheorghe (Sepsiszentgyörgyi Futsal Club).

Culture
The Hungarian artist Jenő Gyárfás was born there and was a lifelong resident. His former studio is now an art gallery and exhibition hall.

Education

 Puskás Tivadar High School
 Székely Mikó High School
 Mikes Kelemen High School
 Mihai Viteazul National College
 Plugor Sandor Art High School
 Váradi József School

References

External links

 
 

 
Populated places in Covasna County
Localities in Transylvania
Cities in Romania
Capitals of Romanian counties